Berk Hakman (born 14 August 1981) is a Turkish theater, film and television actor. He is also a musician and photographer. He is known for awarded film Tepenin Ardı, hit period series Hatırla Sevgili, hit series Suskunlar which the first Turkish drama sold to the USA market for remake. He composed the song "Texas".

Biography
He was born in Ankara, Turkey to a family with roots in Sarajevo, Bosnia. His father is Ataman Hakman, a dentist and musician from Erkin Koray's Underground Quartet. Berk Hakman has played the guitar since he was 11 years old. In high school he played keyboard instruments, trumpets and bass guitars. He went to Antalya in 1999 to study Tourism Management at Akdeniz University, just after the 1999 İzmit earthquake, and continued for two years. There, he entered the theater club. He then graduated from the acting department of the State Conservatory of the Mimar Sinan University in Istanbul. He started his film career with Okul which was shot in 2003. In series Suskunlar, He played a police who can't feel pain, heat, cold and ex-guilty.

Filmography

References

External links 
 

Living people
1981 births
Mimar Sinan Fine Arts University alumni
Turkish male film actors
Turkish male television actors